Juan Pedro Julián Aguirre y López de Anaya (October 19, 1781 – July 17, 1837) was an Argentine revolutionary and politician.

Aguirre was born in Buenos Aires, on October 19, 1781, to parents Cristobal Aguirre Hordenana Lecue and Maria Manuela Inocencia Lopez Anaya y Ruiz Gamez. He fought in the wars against the British troops of 1806/07, rising to the rank of Captain. In 1820, he briefly served as interim Supreme Director of the United Provinces of the Río de la Plata, and was the last official to hold that title. In 1824, he was minister of economics, and in 1826, he became the first president of the newly established national bank.

See also
List of heads of state of Argentina

References

Supreme Directors of the United Provinces of the Río de la Plata
People of the Argentine War of Independence
Government ministers of Argentina
Argentine military personnel
1781 births
1837 deaths
Politicians from Buenos Aires